Nicholas Irving (born November 28, 1986) is an American author and former soldier. He was a special operations sniper in the 3rd Ranger Battalion for the U.S. Army.

Early life
Irving was born in Augsburg, Germany, growing up the son of two enlisted soldiers.

Career

Military
Irving joined the U.S. military, intending to join the Navy SEALs, but he failed a colorblindness test and joined the United States Army Rangers, serving in Iraq and Afghanistan. Irving was issued a SR-25 rifle, which he nicknamed Dirty Diana in which he is attributed with 33 confirmed kills.

Entertainment
After the Army, Irving pursued an entertainment career.

In 2016, Irving was one of four military leaders to serve as coaches on the reality show American Grit with John Cena.

Starting in August 2017, Irving began appearing as a recurring guest on the popular firearm YouTube channel, Demolition Ranch. He has also made appearances on other YouTube channels such as, LunkersTV and Insider.

He also served as an on-set advisor for Doug Liman's 2017 sniper film The Wall.

Author
In 2015, he wrote and published with Gary Brozek The Reaper: Autobiography of One of the Deadliest Special Ops Snipers, a New York Times bestseller about his military career during the War on Terror. On February 2, 2015, The Weinstein Company acquired the television rights to make a miniseries out of the autobiography. On March 5, 2015, NBC picked up the miniseries from Weinstein. 
In late 2017 Irving revealed in a podcast that the miniseries has been scrapped, but a movie based on the book was in preproduction.

Personal life
Irving married Jessica Irving in 2007.

Bibliography
Nonfiction
 Basic & Intermediate Combat Survival (2011) 
 Team Reaper: 3rd Ranger Battalion's Deadliest Sniper Team (2012) 
 The Reaper: Autobiography of One of the Deadliest Special Ops Snipers (2015, with Gary Brozek) 
 Way of the Reaper: My Greatest Untold Missions and the Art of Being a Sniper (2016, with Gary Brozek) 

Fiction
 Reaper: Ghost Target (2018, with A.J. Tata) 
 Reaper: Threat Zero (2019, with A.J. Tata) 
Reaper: Drone Strike (2020, with A.J. Tata)

See also

American Sniper
List of snipers
Longest recorded sniper kills

References

External links

 
 

1987 births
21st-century American male actors
21st-century American non-fiction writers
American autobiographers
21st-century American male writers
American military snipers
Entertainment law
Entertainment lawyers
Living people
Male actors from Maryland
People from Maryland
United States Army Rangers
United States Army non-commissioned officers
American male non-fiction writers
United States Army personnel of the Iraq War
United States Army personnel of the War in Afghanistan (2001–2021)